Iain Kennedy (born 4 April 1950) is an Irish rower. He competed at the 1976 Summer Olympics and the 1980 Summer Olympics.

References

1950 births
Living people
Irish male rowers
Olympic rowers of Ireland
Rowers at the 1976 Summer Olympics
Rowers at the 1980 Summer Olympics
Place of birth missing (living people)